Mikola Yermalovich (April 29, 1921 in Dzyarzhynsk Raion, Minsk Voblast – March 5, 2000) was a Belarusian writer and historian.

Biography  
Ermalovich was born in the village of Maly Novoselki (modern Dzerzhinsky district). He finished a local school and graduated from Minsk Pedagogical Institute in 1947.
On graduation he worked as a teacher, school inspector and headmaster. Ermalovich was visually impaired and had to retire at the age of 35. He devoted decades to studying ancient Belarusian chronicles and other primary sources.

Criticism 
Some commentators believe that Yermalovich presented the pseudo-historic conception of Litvinism, which asserts that the Grand Duchy of Lithuania was Belarusian, not Lithuanian.
Other professional historians criticized Ermalovich's books as non-scientific, however it is acknowledged that "it was Ermalovich's books that contributed a great deal to the expansion of research in the field of ancient history of Belarus" and "encouraged [Belarusian] academic historians to pursue further studies of the history of the Grand Duchy of Lithuania"

Resting place 
Ermalovich is buried in the Old Cemetery of Maladzechna. On his grave on the back of the monument is written: "He loved Belarus…".

Bibliography 

 Dear to Belarusians name (Дарагое беларусам імя, 1970)
 Following in the tracks of one myth (Па слядах аднаго міфа, 1989)
 Ancient Belarus: Polatsk and Navahrudak periods (Старажытная Беларусь: Полацкі і Новагародскі перыяды, 1990)
 Ancient Belarus: Vilna period (Старажытная Беларусь: Віленскі перыяд, 1994)
 Belarusian state Grand Duchy of Lithuania (Беларуская дзяржава Вялікае Княства Літоўскае, 2000)

Awards 
 State award of Belarus for his book Ancient Belarus (1992)
 Award of Uladzimir Karatkevich
 Medal of Francysk Skaryna (1993)

See also 
 Litvins

External links 
Biography at Slounik.org
Article in Nasha Slova («Наша слова»)
Books at Knihi.com («Беларуская Палічка»)

References 

1921 births
2000 deaths
People from Dzyarzhynsk District
20th-century Belarusian historians
Belarusian male writers
Soviet historians
Maxim Tank Belarusian State Pedagogical University alumni
Recipients of the Francysk Skaryna Medal
Male non-fiction writers